Co-Cathedral of Santa María, also known as Vigo Co-Cathedral, is a Spanish religious building. It is co-cathedral with Tui Cathedral. The original church was rebuilt in neo-classical style after being burnt down by Francis Drake's soldiers in 1585.

References

Roman Catholic cathedrals in Galicia (Spain)
Churches in Galicia (Spain)